Tangut numerals are characters used to denote numbers in the Tangut script, which was used for writing the Tangut language under the Western Xia regime (1038–1227) and during the subsequent Yuan dynasty (1271–1368).

Tangut numerals are written in the same format as Chinese numerals. There is an ordinary set of digits that is used for writing numbers within Tangut text (for example, chapter numbers and dates) in manuscripts and printed books, as well as for engraving on monumental inscriptions on stone. There are also two additional sets of number characters used for special purposes. Page numbers in printed books dating from the Western Xia period and the Yuan dynasty are often written using Chinese numerals.

The latest surviving example of Tangut numerals occur on the Tangut dharani pillars which were erected in Baoding on the 10th month of the 15th year of the Hongzhi era of the Ming dynasty, which corresponds to 1502.

Cardinal numbers
The characters used to write ordinary cardinal numbers are listed below. There are two different words for "ten":  *gha is the normal word, but  *sha is sometimes used, especially for the number of days in dates, e.g.  (gha lhi sha ny) "10th day of the 10th month".

Multiple-digit numbers are constructed using a similar method to that for Chinese and Japanese numerals.

Ordinal numbers
The word   (phu tsew) may be used for "first", although  (lew tsew) is also found.

Fractions

The character  *khwy is used for one half. For more complex fractions, the formula "n [parts] out of d parts" is used, where n is the numerator and d is the denominator, and the denominator is specified first. This corresponds to the structure for fractions in Chinese, for example Tangut  (so pha kha lew) "one third" corresponds to Chinese 三分之一　(sān fēn zhī yī) "one third".

Special numbers
In addition to the normal set of cardinal numbers, there is an additional set of characters used for the numbers 2 through 7 in some circumstances. These numbers are only used in a few certain words, as well as in special month names that are used in a Tangut ode entitled Poem on Pleasure of Every Month. Ksenia Kepping considers this and other odes in the same collection (dated 1185) to be written in a special ritual language, using vocabulary which is not normally used in the common Tangut language.

There is also a special set of filiation characters for the numbers 2 through 8 which are used exclusively to indicate the relative seniority of sons, where the number is followed by the word  *ew "son". The numbers from 2 to 7 are phonetically identical (2, 4, 6, 7) or phonetically very close (3, 5) to the corresponding ritual numbers used in the Poem on Pleasure of Every Month, but the character for 8 is phonetically identical to the normal character for 8.

Unlike the ordinary Tangut numbers, which are closely cognate to the numbers used in other Tibeto-Burman languages such as Tibetan and Nuosu, the ritual and filiation numbers do not appear to be related to numbers in any other language. Moreover, the characters for 4 and 7 are homophones in both the ritual and filiation series, which is implausible for a spoken language.

The ritual numbers are used in the following words, which are all related to Buddhism or astrology:

  (zhu lo) "two fish" (i.e. pisces)
  (rer u) "three storehouses" (i.e. the tripiṭaka)
  (ngwyr ka) "four stringed-instrument" (i.e. the pipa)
  (chyr nir ngyr) "Five Platforms Mountain" (i.e. the Western Xia equivalent of the sacred Mount Wutai, which was located in the Helan Mountains)
  (ngwyr ngewr) "seven sounds" (i.e. seven claps of thunder or bursts of music)

Dates
Tangut numbers are used to denote the year, month and day in date expressions.

A number followed by the character  *kew "year" indicates the year of the specified era, for example  (tshwu wu gha chhiw kew) means the 16th year of the Qianyou era (i.e. 1185).

Lunar months are designated as a number followed by  *lhi "moon, month", except that there are special words for the first and last month. An intercalary month is indicated by putting the character  *lhu in front of the month name, for example  (lhu rer lhi) "intercalary 12th month). There are also special month names used in the ritual language of the Poem on Pleasure of Every Month.

A number followed by the character  *ny "day" indicates the day of the month, for example  (sha lhi sha gy ny) "19th day of the 7th month".

See also
 Tangut people
 Tangut script
 Tangut language

Footnotes

References
 
 
 

Numerals
Tangut script